Live in Europe is the first live album by American singer and songwriter Melody Gardot, released on February 9, 2018, by Decca Records.

Background
The album was recorded in various venues across Europe between 2012 and 2016. It contains 17 tracks carefully selected from more than 300 concerts and is released as a double CD or triple LP. She also was the album producer. Gardot explained, "I dreamed to have a live album since many years ago. Something that would be a dedication to the people who welcomed us all over the world. At first, I had wanted to seek out the “best of” in a way that would illustrate the most perfect performances from our concerts over the last few years... This album holds my heart, and the love of all the people who supported us along the way. It is as much a gift to me, for the memories it holds, as it is my gift to you, the listener." Regarding the album cover where she is seen wearing only her guitar, she commented in her interview to Numéro, "For me an album cover is like a movie poster. I wanted an image that was pure femininity, which could please a sculptor. I went through a lot of suffering. But managing to stand up nude on stage carrying a guitar is a victory."

Reception
Matt Collar of AllMusic described Live in Europe as "a gorgeously produced collection showcasing her emotive vocals in an organic, deeply atmospheric concert framework." Christopher Loudon of JazzTimes stated, "The cover shows a woman, center stage, spotlit, back to the camera, nude save a guitar. The inference is obvious: This, her first live album, is Gardot laid bare. But Gardot has ranked among the most nakedly honest and emotionally vulnerable of singers, ever since her stellar debut with Worrisome Heart in 2008. Live in Europes two discs—17 cuts culled from more than 300 concerts between 2012 and 2016—simply confirm that she exhibits the same breathtaking naturalism in front of thousands-strong audiences." John Bungey of The Times added, "Well the nude cover shot (tasteful, from the rear) threw me a bit, but inside there's a fine record. Amid the flurry of photogenic young women signed by the majors after Diana Krall seduced the pop public into buying jazz, Melody Gardot has proved the most enduring and original." A. D. Amorosi writing for The Philadelphia Inquirer commented that the album, "is an exceptional example of how Gardot breathes when out and about." The Christian Science Monitor included the album in its top picks list, observing, "...Gardot’s elastic alto effortlessly channel the best elements of Barbra Streisand, Edith Piaf, and Nina Simone, and you’ll wonder why she isn’t a household name."

Track listing

Personnel
Melody Gardot – vocals, guitar, piano
Chuck Staab III – electric piano, drums
Devin Greenwood – organ, percussion, backing vocals
Mitchell Long – guitar, backing vocals
Aidan Caroll – double bass 
Edwin Livingston – double bass
Sam Minaie – double bass
Stephan Braun – cello
James Casey – saxophone
Irwin Hall – alto saxophone, tenor saxophone, flute
Korey Riker – baritone saxophone
Shareef Clayton – trumpet
Bryan Brock – percussion

Charts

Weekly charts

Year-end charts

References

External links
 

2018 live albums
Decca Records live albums
Melody Gardot albums